The Qualification Competition for the 2010 AFC U-16 Championship

Format

For all the groups with six teams, the winner and runners-up of each group will qualify for the 2010 AFC U-16 Championship (Finals). For the one group with three teams, only the group winner will qualify. And the one best third-placed team from all the groups with six teams will qualify for the 2010 AFC U-16 Championship (Finals).

Seedings

The draw for the 2010 AFC U-16 Championship (Qualifiers) took place at AFC House on 20 February 2009.

A total number of 45 teams are eligible for the qualifying competition. The West Zone comprised 24 teams and they drew according to their ranking to make four groups of six teams each.

The East Zone had 21 teams and they drew into three groups of six teams and one group of three teams.

West Asia
(Ranked 1st to 23rd)

East Asia
(Ranked 1st to 19th)

Notes
 – Did not enter
 – Initially withdrew and then later re-entered.
 – Officially withdrew on 17 September
 – Officially withdrew on 17 September 
 – Officially withdrew on 4 October

Group A
All matches will be held in Kuala Lumpur, Malaysia (UTC+8).

Group B
All matches will be held in Kathmandu, Nepal (UTC+5).

Group C
All matches will be held in Sana'a, Yemen (UTC+4).

Group D
All matches will be held in Al Ain, United Arab Emirates (UTC+3).

Group E
All matches will be held in Bacolod, Philippines (UTC+8).

Group F
All matches will be held in Hebei, China (UTC+8).

Group G
All matches will be held in Bangkok, Thailand (UTC+7).

Group H
All matches will be held in Canberra, Australia (UTC+10).

Third-placed qualifiers
At the end of the first stage, a comparison was made between the third placed teams from the seven groups of six teams. The one best third-placed teams advanced to the 2010 AFC U-16 Championship.

Because three group has one team fewer than the others, following the withdrawal of Sri Lanka, Mongolia and Maldives, matches against the sixth-placed team in each group are not included in this ranking. As a result, four matches played by each team will count for the purposes of the third-placed table.

Qualifiers

See also
2010 AFC U-19 Championship qualification

References 

Qual
AFC U-16 Championship qualification
Qualification